Ruse Central railway station is the main station serving the city and municipality of Ruse, the fifth most populous city in Bulgaria. After the opening of the Danube Bridge in 1954, a new grand Stalinist Central Railway Station was envisioned for the city of Ruse. The new station opened in late 1955 temporarily becoming the biggest on the Balkan peninsula featuring three platforms, with four tracks and one passing track.

It is a transport hub, with trains to Gorna Oryahovitsa (mostly), to Sofia, Varna, Samuil, and Burgas seasonally, as well as Bucharest and Istanbul internationally. The station serves as a border checkpoint for trains crossing into Romania, via the Danube Bridge.

See also
 Trolleybuses in Ruse

External links

Railway stations in Bulgaria
Railway stations opened in 1955
Buildings and structures in Ruse, Bulgaria
1955 establishments in Bulgaria